Ernest Spiteri-Gonzi (born 21 October 1955) is a retired footballer who played as a striker. Born in England, he represented the Malta national team.

Club career
During his club career, Spiteri-Gonzi played for Hibernians. He twice became Maltese top goalscorer, in the 1980–81 and 1981–82 seasons. He was also voted Maltese Player of the Year in the 1981–82 season.

International career
Spieri-Gonzi has played for Malta and has earned a total of 20 caps, scoring 3 goals. He has represented his country in 4 FIFA World Cup qualification matches. On 18 March 1979, in a match against Turkey, he scored the first Maltese international goal in 17 years.

References

External links

1955 births
Living people
Sportspeople from Aldershot
People with acquired Maltese citizenship
Maltese footballers
Malta international footballers
Association football forwards
Hibernians F.C. players
Footballers from Hampshire